Ali Yusuf Zikri is a Libyan politician and engineer who served in the Libyan government as Secretary of the General People's Committee of Libya (al-lajna ash-sha'bēya al-'āmma) for Industry and Mines. He received this appointmentin January 2007 and replaced former Minister of Industry & Mines, Ali Umar al-Hasnawi. He was formerly acting as GPCO Secretary for Telecommunication and Transport.

References

Members of the General People's Committee of Libya
Living people
Year of birth missing (living people)
Place of birth missing (living people)
21st-century Libyan people